The China National Tea Museum is located in Hangzhou, Zhejiang province, China. The exhibitions display tea production, and different kinds of tea. Exhibitions are in Chinese and English languages.

See also
 List of museums in China
 History of tea in China
 Tenfu Tea Museum
 List of food and beverage museums

References

External links
 Official website

Museums in Hangzhou
Tea museums
Chinese tea